Lukáš Rosol was the defending champion, but withdrew because he was still playing in Indian Wells this year.

Aljaž Bedene won the title, defeating Tim Smyczek in the final, 7–6(7–3), 3–6, 6–3.

Seeds

Draw

Finals

Top half

Bottom half

References
 Main Draw
 Qualifying Draw

Irving Tennis Classic - Singles